Edward Granville Eliot, 3rd Earl of St Germans  (29 August 1798 – 7 October 1877; styled Lord Elliot from 1823 to 1845) was a British politician and diplomat.

Background and education
St Germans was born in Plymouth, Devon, the son of William Eliot, 2nd Earl of St Germans and his first wife, Lady Georgina (13 April 1769 – 4 March 1806), daughter of Granville Leveson-Gower, 1st Marquess of Stafford. He was educated at Westminster School from 1809 to 1811, and matriculated at Christ Church, Oxford on 13 December 1815.

Political career
St Germans became the Secretary of Legation at Madrid on 21 November 1823. He became member of parliament for Liskeard the following year. Beginning his career as a Tory, he remained loyal to Robert Peel, and served as a Junior Lord of the Treasury from 1827 until 1830. Out of parliament between 1832 and 1837, he served in Peel's second government first as Chief Secretary for Ireland and later as Postmaster General of the United Kingdom. He brokered the so-called Lord Eliot Convention in Spain, which aimed to end the indiscriminate executions by firing squad of prisoners on both sides of the First Carlist War.

When the debate over the Corn Laws broke the Conservative Party he followed Peel, and served as Lord Lieutenant of Ireland in Lord Aberdeen's coalition government. In that role, he hosted the visit of Queen Victoria and the Prince Consort to the 1853 Great Exhibition held in Dublin. The Queen gave Lady St Germans a gift of jewellery to mark the occasion. He was twice Lord Steward under Lord Palmerston. In 1860, he accompanied the Prince of Wales on his tour of Canada and the USA.

Family life
Lord St Germans married Lady Jemima Cornwallis (24 December 1803, Brome, Suffolk – 2 July 1856, Dover Street, London), daughter of Charles Cornwallis, 2nd Marquess Cornwallis, at St James Church, Westminster, on 2 September 1824. They had six sons and two daughters:

Lady Louisa Susan Cornwallis Eliot (17 December 1825 – 15 January 1911), married Walter Ponsonby, 7th Earl of Bessborough and was the mother of Edward Ponsonby, 8th Earl of Bessborough.
Edward John Cornwallis Eliot, Lord Eliot (2 April 1827 – 26 November 1864), born in London, educated at Eton from 1839 to 1843, matriculated at Christ Church, Oxford on 21 October 1844, styled Lord Eliot from January 1845, commissioned a Cornet and Sub-lieutenant, 1st Regiment of Life Guards and subsequently Captain of that Regiment, 1852, died unmarried at Port Eliot.
Captain Granville Charles Cornwallis Eliot (9 September 1828 – 5 November 1854), officer Coldstream Guards, killed at the Battle of Inkerman.
William Gordon Cornwallis Eliot, 4th Earl of St Germans (14 December 1829 – 19 March 1881)
Ernest Cornwallis Eliot (28 April 1831 – 23 January 1832)
Lady Elizabeth Harriet Cornwallis Eliot (September 1833 – 16 March 1835)
Henry Cornwallis Eliot, 5th Earl of St Germans (11 February 1835 – 24 September 1911)
Colonel Charles George Cornwallis Eliot, CVO (16 October 1839 – 22 May 1901), courtier and soldier, married on 26 October 1865 Constance Rhiannon Guest, daughter of Sir John Josiah Guest, Bt and Lady Charlotte Guest, succeeded Roden Noel as a Groom of the Bedchamber 1871 to 1899, then replaced by Sir Francis Knollys and succeeded Alpin McGregor as a Gentleman Usher Daily Waiter to Queen Victoria.

Lord St Germans died at St Germans on 7 October 1877, aged 79. He was the great-grandfather of Margaret Eliot (1914–2011), the mother of Peter and Jane Asher.

References

External links

Lords Lieutenant of Ireland
Deputy Lieutenants of Cornwall
Earls of St Germans
Politicians from Plymouth, Devon
Members of the Privy Council of the United Kingdom
Members of the Privy Council of Ireland
Alumni of Christ Church, Oxford
Knights Grand Cross of the Order of the Bath
United Kingdom Postmasters General
Eliot, Edward
People educated at Westminster School, London
Eliot, Edward
Eliot, Edward
Eliot, Edward
Eliot, Edward
Eliot, Edward
Saint Germans, E3
1798 births
1877 deaths
Edward Granville Eliot
Chief Secretaries for Ireland